Note: The sources and years from 1810 to 2100 come from this video: When more than 20 countries reach a milestone, such as the 50 million milestone, the sources come from this video: 

This is a list of population milestones by country (and year first reached). Only existing countries are included, not former countries.

20 million milestone

 : 450 B.C., most likely 1000 B.C.
 : 400 B.C.
 : 60 B.C.
 : 400
 : 1100
 : 1200, most likely 480 B.C.
 : 1400
 : Unknown, most likely 1250
 : 1500
 : 1765
 : 1770, most likely 1250
 : 1815, most likely 1629
 : 1818
 : 1837
 : 1840
 : 1843, most likely 1
 : 1844
 : 1882
 : 1883
 : 1905, most likely 1500
 : 1911
 : 1930
 : 1933
 : 1949
 : 1949
 : 1953
 : 1953
 : 1956
 : 1957
 : 1959
 : 1967
 : 1967
 : 1968
 : 1968
 : 1971
 : 1981
 : 1982
 : 1983
 : 1986
 : 1990
 : 1990
 : 1990
 : 1991
 : 1993
 : 1995
 : 1995
 : 1995
 : 1999
 : 1999
 : 2002
 : 2005
 : 2005
 : 2005
 : 2006
 : 2008
 : 2009
 : 2009
 : 2009
 : 2010
 : 2016
 : 2019
 : 2020
 : 2022
 : 2024 (est.)
 : 2027 (est.)
 : 2027 (est.)
 : 2028 (est.)
 : 2028 (est.)
 : 2028 (est.)
 : 2031 (est.)
 : 2037 (est.)
 : 2037 (est.)
 : 2038 (est.)
 : 2038 (est.)
 : 2040 (est.)
 : 2041 (est.)
 : 2042 (est.)
 : 2051 (est.)
 : 2068 (est.)
 : 2068 (est.)
 : 2095 (est.)
 : 2100 (est.)
 : 2105 (est.)

25 million milestone

 : 450 B.C., most likely 1667 B.C.
 : 350 B.C., most likely 737 B.C.
 : 1163
 : 1495, most likely 1925
 : 1680, most likely 1800
 : 1786
 : 1818
 : 1852
 : 1854
 : 1861
 : 1863
 : 1873
 : 1902
 : 1907
 : 1916
 : 1934
 : 1937
 : 1939
 : 1951
 : 1957
 : 1957
 : 1958
 : 1959
 : 1960
 : 1966
 : 1966
 : 1967
 : 1973
 : 1975
 : 1977
 : 1979
 : 1983
 : 1989
 : 1990
 : 1991
 : 1992
 : 1997
 : 1997
 : 2001
 : 2002
 : 2002
 : 2003
 : 2003
 : 2004
 : 2005
 : 2007
 : 2011
 : 2012
 : 2013
 : 2013
 : 2014
 : 2017
 : 2018
 : 2019
 : 2019
 : 2021 
 : 2027 (est.)
 : 2028 (est.)
 : 2028 (est.)
 : 2031 (est.)
 : 2032 (est.)
 : 2036 (est.)
 : 2037 (est.)
 : 2037 (est.)
 : 2043 (est.)
 : 2048 (est.)
 : 2050 (est.)
 : 2052 (est.)
 : 2054 (est.)
 : 2057 (est.)
 : 2058 (est.)
 : 2067 (est.)
 : 2070 (est.)
 : 2090 (est.)
 : 2097 (est.)

30 million milestone

 : Unknown, most likely 1442 B.C.
 : Unknown, most likely 629 B.C.
 : 1788
 : 1791
 : 1809
 : 1837
 : 1858
 : 1878
 : 1880
 : 1883
 : 1905
 : 1925
 : 1927
 : 1935
 : 1943
 : 1944
 : 1953
 : 1958
 : 1959
 : 1964
 : 1964
 : 1965
 : 1965
 : 1967
 : 1972
 : 1972
 : 1975
 : 1982
 : 1985
 : 1986
 : 1986
 : 1996
 : 1998
 : 1998
 : 1998
 : 2004
 : 2004
 : 2008
 : 2011
 : 2011
 : 2014
 : 2014
 : 2014
 : 2014
 : 2015
 : 2018
 : 2019
 : 2019
 : 2021
 : 2022
 : 2024 (est.)
 : 2026 (est.)
 : 2026 (est.)
 : 2025 (est.)
 : 2034 (est.)
 : 2035 (est.)
 : 2038 (est.)
 : 2039 (est.)
 : 2039 (est.)
 : 2040 (est.)
 : 2044 (est.)
 : 2044 (est.)
 : 2045 (est.)
 : 2059 (est.)
 : 2059 (est.)
 : 2062 (est.)
 : 2066 (est.)
 : 2076 (est.)
 : 2080 (est.)
 : 2089 (est.)

35 million milestone
 : Unknown, most likely 1200 B.C.
 : Unknown, most likely 600 B.C.
 : 1839
 : 1842
 : 1855
 : 1864
 : 1873
 : 1892
 : 1893
 : 1912
 : 1924
 : 1924
 : 1946
 : 1946
 : 1947
 : 1958
 : 1963
 : 1969
 : 1970
 : 1971
 : 1971
 : 1973
 : 1975
 : 1978
 : 1939, 1979
 : 1980
 : 1982
 : 1991
 : 1994
 : 1996
 : 2002
 : 2004
 : 2009
 : 2011
 : 2011
 : 2013
 : 2013
 : 2015
 : 2016
 : 2021
 : 2023 (est.)
 : 2024 (est.)
 : 2025 (est.)
 : 2027 (est.)
 : 2027 (est.)
 : 2028 (est.)
 : 2028 (est.)
 : 2029 (est.)
 : 2030 (est.)
 : 2032 (est.)
 : 2032 (est.)
 : 2036 (est.)
 : 2041 (est.)
 : 2041 (est.)
 : 2042 (est.)
 : 2045 (est.)
 : 2046 (est.)
 : 2051 (est.)
 : 2052 (est.)
 : 2054 (est.)
 : 2059 (est.)
 : 2061 (est.)
 : 2069 (est.)
 : 2070 (est.)
 : 2073 (est.)
 : 2103 (est.)

40 million milestone

 : 200 B.C., most likely 950 B.C.
 : 100 B.C., most likely 1002 A.D.
 : 1848
 : 1870
 : 1871
 : 1890
 : 1890
 : 1904
 : 1906
 : 1928
 : 1939
 : 1953
 : 1954
 : 1955
 : 1955
 : 1962
 : 1967
 : 1973
 : 1974
 : 1976
 : 1977
 : 1981
 : 1984
 : 1985
 : 1988
 : 1994
 : 1994
 : 1997
 : 2001
 : 2007
 : 2008
 : 2009
 : 2016
 : 2017
 : 2017
 : 2020 
 : 2022
 : 2023 (est.)
 : 2027 (est.)
 : 2028 (est.)
 : 2029 (est.)
 : 2032 (est.)
 : 2032 (est.)
 : 2034 (est.)
 : 2036 (est.)
 : 2036 (est.)
 : 2038 (est.)
 : 2038 (est.)
 : 2039 (est.)
 : 2046 (est.)
 : 2047 (est.)
 : 2047 (est.)
 : 2048 (est.)
 : 2052 (est.)
 : 2053 (est.)
 : 2057 (est.)
 : 2060 (est.)
 : 2061 (est.)
 : 2078 (est.)
 : 2083 (est.)
 : 2083 (est.)
 : 2086 (est.)

45 million milestone

 : Unknown, most likely 900 B.C.
 : Unknown, most likely 1010 A.D.
 : 1861
 : 1875
 : 1884
 : 1902
 : 1915
 : 1925
 : 1943
 : 1944
 : 1959
 : 1959
 : 1961
 : 1961
 : 1966
 : 1966
 : 1972
 : 1979
 : 1979
 : 1981
 : 1982
 : 1984
 : 1989
 : 1995
 : 1998
 : 1999
 : 2001
 : 2007
 : 2010
 : 2011
 : 2015
 : 2020
 : 2020
 : 2022
 : 2022
 : 2025 (est.)
 : 2027 (est.)
 : 2031 (est.)
 : 2034 (est.)
 : 2038 (est.)
 : 2041 (est.)
 : 2041 (est.)
 : 2044 (est.)
 : 2044 (est.)
 : 2045 (est.)
 : 2045 (est.)
 : 2047 (est.)
 : 2052 (est.)
 : 2052 (est.)
 : 2054 (est.)
 : 2058 (est.)
 : 2061 (est.)
 : 2052 (est.)
 : 2063 (est.)
 : 2068 (est.)
 : 2069 (est.)
 : 2088 (est.)
 : 2095 (est.)
 : 2100 (est.)

50 million milestone

 : Unknown, most likely 727 B.C.
 : Unknown, most likely 147 B.C.
 : 1872
 : 1879
 : 1893
 : 1911
 : 1925
 : 1948
 : 1948
 : 1961
 : 1962
 : 1965
 : 1965
 : 1968
 : 1969
 : 1977
 : 1981
 : 1982
 : 1983
 : 1985
 : 1986
 : 1987
 : 1992
 : 2003
 : 2009
 : 2009
 : 2012
 : 2015
 : 2017
 : 2019
 : 2024 (est.)
 : 2026 (est.)
 : 2030 (est.)
 : 2030 (est.)
 : 2033 (est.)
 : 2033 (est.)
 : 2034 (est.)
 : 2038 (est.)
 : 2038 (est.)
 : 2044 (est.)
 : 2048 (est.)
 : 2049 (est.)
 : 2050 (est.)
 : 2055 (est.)
 : 2058 (est.)
 : 2058 (est.)
 : 2063 (est.)
 : 2068 (est.)
 : 2069 (est.)
 : 2069 (est.)
 : 2070 (est.)
 : 2076 (est.)
 : 2077 (est.)
 : 2098 (est.)

60 million milestone

 : Unknown, most likely 393 B.C.
 : Unknown, most likely 1044 A.D.
 : 1887
 : 1892
 : 1906
 : 1926
 : 1939
 : 1954
 : 1968
 : 1972
 : 1973
 : 1975
 : 1985
 : 1989
 : 1992
 : 1995
 : 1996
 : 1997
 : 1997
 : 2002
 : 2005
 : 2008
 : 2013
 : 2021
 : 2022
 : 2026 (est.)
 : 2028 (est.)
 : 2034 (est.)
 : 2035 (est.)
 : 2038 (est.)
 : 2041 (est.)
 : 2044 (est.)
 : 2044 (est.)
 : 2046 (est.)
 : 2049 (est.)
 : 2052 (est.)
 : 2060 (est.)
 : 2061 (est.)
 : 2062 (est.)
 : 2069 (est.)
 : 2069 (est.)
 : 2075 (est.)
 : 2080 (est.)
 : 2085 (est.)
 : 2094 (est.)
 : 2096 (est.)
 : 2100 (est.)

70 million milestone
 : Unknown, most likely 127 B.C.
 : Unknown, most likely 1060 A.D.
 : 1895
 : 1909
 : 1936
 : 1938
 : 1951
 : 1959
 : 1975
 : 1977
 : 1979
 : 1981
 : 1992
 : 1996
 : 2001
 : 2002
 : 2005
 : 2008
 : 2013
 : 2022
 : 2024 (est.)
 : 2029 (est.)
 : 2033 (est.)
 : 2034 (est.)
 : 2038 (est.)
 : 2042 (est.)
 : 2045 (est.)
 : 2047 (est.)
 : 2049 (est.)
 : 2054 (est.)
 : 2059 (est.)
 : 2062 (est.)
 : 2070 (est.)
 : 2073 (est.)
 : 2079 (est.)
 : 2081 (est.)
 : 2082 (est.)
 : 2086 (est.)
 : 2088 (est.)
 : 2093 (est.)

80 million milestone

 : Unknown, most likely 134 A.D.
 : Unknown, most likely 1079 A.D.
 : 1902
 : 1923
 : 1948
 : 1957
 : 1964
 : 1980
 : 1981
 : 1984
 : 1987
 : 1992
 : 2000
 : 2002
 : 2007
 : 2008
 : 2016
 : 2017
 : 2017
 : 2029 (est.)
 : 2038 (est.)
 : 2041 (est.)
 : 2050 (est.)
 : 2052 (est.)
 : 2052 (est.)
 : 2054 (est.)
 : 2062 (est.)
 : 2071 (est.)
 : 2080 (est.)
 : 2081 (est.)
 : 2085 (est.)
 : 2095 (est.)
 : 2099 (est.)
 : 2100 (est.)

90 million milestone

 : Unknown, most likely 398 A.D.
 : Unknown, most likely 1099 A.D.
 : 1908
 : 1936
 : 1957
 : 1961
 : 1968
 : 1984
 : 1985
 : 1988
 : 1993
 : 2008
 : 2012
 : 2012
 : 2014
 : 2021
 : 2026 (est.)
 : 2027 (est.)
 : 2033 (est.)
 : 2043 (est.)
 : 2049 (est.)
 : 2057 (est.)
 : 2057 (est.)
 : 2057 (est.)
 : 2058 (est.)
 : 2069 (est.)
 : 2082 (est.)
 : 2092 (est.)
 : 2100 (est.)

100 million milestone

 : Unknown, most likely 664 A.D.
 : Unknown, most likely 1175 A.D.
 : 1914
 : 1948
 : 1965
 : 1967
 : 1972
 : 1988
 : 1988
 : 1992
 : 1999
 : 2014
 : 2016
 : 2019
 : 2023 (est.)
 : 2024 (est.)
 : 2037 (est.);
 : 2047 (est.)
 : 2048 (est.)
 : 2054 (est.)
 : 2063 (est.)
 : 2064 (est.)
 : 2064 (est.)
 : 2064 (est.)
 : 2077 (est.)
 : 2092 (est.)

110 million milestone

 : Unknown, most likely 936 A.D.
 : Unknown, most likely 1714
 : 1921
 : 1955
 : 1969
 : 1974
 : 1976
 : 1991
 : 1992
 : 1996
 : 2007
 : 2020
 : 2021
 : 2025 (est.)
 : 2027 (est.)
 : 2038 (est.)
 : 2041 (est.)
 : 2052 (est.)
 : 2061 (est.)
 : 2066 (est.)
 : 2067 (est.)
 : 2069 (est.)
 : 2072 (est.)
 : 2086 (est.)

120 million milestone

 : Unknown, most likely 993 A.D.
 : Unknown, most likely 1720
 : 1926
 : 1961
 : 1972
 : 1980
 : 1983
 : 1995
 : 1996
 : 2000
 : 2012
 : 2021
 : 2027 (est.)
 : 2030 (est.)
 : 2031 (est.)
 : 2044 (est.)
 : 2057 (est.)
 : 2070 (est.)
 : 2071 (est.)
 : 2071 (est.)
 : 2075 (est.)
 : 2080 (est.)
 : 2096 (est.)

130 million milestone

 : Unknown, most likely 1480
 : Unknown, most likely 1731
 : 1938
 : 1971
 : 1976
 : 1985
 : 1999
 : 2001
 : 2004
 : 2021
 : 2027 (est.)
 : 2033 (est.)
 : 2034 (est.)
 : 2037 (est.)
 : 2048 (est.)
 : 2061 (est.)
 : 2076 (est.)
 : 2078 (est.)
 : 2080 (est.)
 : 2082 (est.)
 : 2091 (est.)

140 million milestone

 : Unknown, most likely 1610 
 : Unknown, most likely 1738
 : 1943
 : 1979
 : 1983
 : 1987
 : 2001
 : 2004
 : 2006
 : 2025 (est.)
 : 2031 (est.)
 : 2036 (est.)
 : 2041 (est.)
 : 2042 (est.)
 : 2051 (est.)
 : 2065 (est.)
 : 2080 (est.)
 : 2083 (est.)
 : 2089 (est.)
 : 2096 (est.)

150 million milestone

 : Unknown, most likely 1647
 : Unknown, most likely 1742
 : 1948
 : 1981
 : 1991
 : 1992
 : 2004
 : 2008
 : 2009
 : 2032 (est.)
 : 2033 (est.)
 : 2039 (est.)
 : 2048 (est.)
 : 2049 (est.)
 : 2054 (est.)
 :  2069 (est.)
 :  2081 (est.)
 : 2084 (est.)
 : 2096 (est.)

200 million milestone

 : Unknown, most likely 1761
 : 1855
 : 1967
 : 1997
 : 2012
 : 2018
 : 2019
 : 2046 (est.)
 : 2049 (est.)
 : 2051 (est.)
 : 2069 (est.)
 :  2092 (est.)
 :  2092 (est.)
 :  2101 (est.)
 :  2109 (est.)

250 million milestone

 : 1775
 : 1907
 : 1989
 : 2013
 : 2025 (est.)
 : 2028 (est.)
 : 2063 (est.)
 : 2068 (est.)
 : 2084 (est.)
 :  2109 (est.)

300 million milestone

 : 1795
 : 1934
 : 2006
 : 2036 (est.)
 : 2040 (est.)
 : 2076 (est.)
 : 2099 (est.)

350 million milestone

 : 1810
 : 1947
 : 2028 (est.)
 : 2043 (est.)
 : 2054 (est.)
 : 2090 (est.)
 : 2117 (est.)

400 million milestone

 : 1900
 : 1954
 : 2049 (est.)
 : 2058 (est.)
 : 2082 (est.)
 : 2107 (est.)

450 million milestone

 : 1916
 : 1961
 : 2055 (est.)
 : 2104 (est.)
 : 2132 (est.)

500 million milestone

 : 1933
 : 1966
 : 2065 (est.)

600 million milestone

 : 1954
 : 1974
 : 2074 (est.)

700 million milestone

 : 1964
 : 1981
 : 2086 (est.)

750 million milestone

 : 1967
 : 1984
 : 2094 (est.)

800 million milestone

 : 1969
 : 1987
 : 2101 (est.)

900 million milestone

 : 1974
 : 1992
 : 2114 (est.)

1 billion milestone

 : 1981
 : 1997
 : 2129 (est.)

1.1 billion milestone

 : 1988
 : 2002

1.2 billion milestone

 : 1995
 : 2008

1.3 billion milestone

 : 2003
 : 2014

1.4 billion milestone

 : 2017
 : 2022

1.5 billion milestone

 : 2030 (est.)

1.6 billion milestone

 : 2041 (est.)

References

Pre-2003 source
 Populstat historic tables used as source for current nations with dates before 2003, e.g. CHINA: population growth of the whole country, for each nation listed.

Milestones